The Move Forward Party is a social democratic and progressive political party in Thailand that opposes the remaining influence of the military junta, which ruled the country from 2014 to 2019. It was founded in 2014 as the Ruam Pattana Chart Thai Party and later changed its name to the Phung Luang Party, but after the 2019 Thai general election, reverted to its original name. It obtained its current name in 2020 after becoming the de facto successor to the dissolved Future Forward Party.

History 
The party was officially founded on 1 May 2014 as the Ruam Pattana Chart Thai Party.

In early 2020, the party became a de facto successor to the Future Forward Party, which had been dissolved by a controversial Constitutional Court order, as following the decision, 55 of Future Forward's 65 MPs (led by Pita Limjaroenrat) announced their plan to join. They vowed to continue the progressive and anti-junta agenda of Future Forward. The party's name was then changed to Move Forward, along with the release of a new logo similar to that of Future Forward.

Election results

Regional elections

References 

Political parties established in 2014
Political parties in Thailand
Left-wing parties in Thailand